Tremper Longman III (born 8 September 1952) is an Old Testament scholar, theologian, professor and author of several books, including 2009 ECPA Christian Book Award winner Dictionary of the Old Testament: Wisdom, Poetry & Writings.

Biography
Longman is Distinguished Scholar of Biblical Studies at Westmont College in Santa Barbara, California, where he was the Robert H. Gundry Professor of Biblical Studies for nineteen years before his retirement in 2017. He earned his B.A. from Ohio Wesleyan University, his M.Div. from Westminster Theological Seminary, and his M.Phil. and  Ph.D. from Yale University.

Prior to joining Westmont in 1998, Longman taught for eighteen years at Westminster Theological Seminary in Philadelphia.  He has also served as visiting professor at The Seattle School of Theology and Psychology, an adjunct professor at Fuller Theological Seminary, and a guest lecturer at Regent College and the Canadian Theological Seminary.

Longman has contributed to a number of commentaries, including the New International Commentary on the Old Testament (The Song of Solomon and Ecclesiastes), NIV Application Commentary (Daniel), New International Biblical Commentary (Jeremiah and Lamentations), and the Baker Old Testament Wisdom series (Proverbs). In addition, he was the senior translator for the wisdom books on the central committee that produced and now monitors the New Living Translation.

He was a main speaker in the conference of Korea Reformed Theological Society in 2016.

Personal life
He is married to Alice Longman and has three sons.

Selected publications

 
 
 

 - originally published in 2008 as part of the 'New International Biblical Commentary'

References

American Calvinist and Reformed theologians
Living people
1952 births
Ohio Wesleyan University alumni
Westminster Theological Seminary alumni
Westminster Theological Seminary faculty
Yale University alumni
Old Testament scholars
Westmont College faculty
American biblical scholars
Translators of the Bible into English
Bible commentators